Bellamy Reservoir is a  impoundment located in Strafford County in eastern New Hampshire, United States, in the town of Madbury. An eastern arm of the lake extends a short distance into Dover. The reservoir serves as the primary water supply for the city of Portsmouth, New Hampshire. Its outlet is the Bellamy River, a tributary of Great Bay, a tidal estuary connected to the Atlantic Ocean by the Piscataqua River. The dam was built in 1960 to supply water to Portsmouth and the Pease Air Force base. 

The reservoir is classified as a warmwater fishery, with observed species including largemouth bass, chain pickerel, horned pout, and black crappie.

See also

List of lakes in New Hampshire

References

Lakes of Strafford County, New Hampshire
Reservoirs in New Hampshire
Protected areas of Strafford County, New Hampshire